Mary Harron (born January 12, 1953) is a Canadian filmmaker and screenwriter, and former entertainment critic. She gained recognition for her role in writing and directing several independent films, including I Shot Andy Warhol (1996), American Psycho (2000), and The Notorious Bettie Page (2005). She co-wrote American Psycho and The Notorious Bettie Page with Guinevere Turner.

Early life
Born in Bracebridge, Ontario, Canada, Harron grew up with a family that was entrenched in the world of film and theater. She is the daughter of Gloria Fisher and Don Harron, a Canadian actor, comedian, author, and director. Her parents divorced when she was six years old. Harron spent her early life residing between Toronto and Los Angeles. Harron's first stepmother, Virginia Leith, was discovered by Stanley Kubrick and acted in his first film, Fear and Desire and was also featured in the 1962 cult classic The Brain That Wouldn't Die. Leith's brief acting career partly inspired Harron's interest in making The Notorious Bettie Page. Harron's stepfather is the novelist Stephen Vizinczey best known for his internationally successful book In Praise of Older Women. Harron's second stepmother is the Canadian singer Catherine McKinnon. Harron's sister, Kelley Harron, is an actor and producer.

Harron moved to England when she was thirteen and later attended St Anne's College, Oxford University, where she received a Bachelors in English. While in England, she dated Tony Blair, later the Prime Minister of the United Kingdom, and Chris Huhne, another Oxford student who later became a prominent politician. She then moved to New York City and was part of its 1970s punk scene.

Influences 
During her adolescence, Harron was exposed to many different forms of art and film, and this is where she gained many of her influences. In her interview with The New School, Harron states that she had many influences. “My parents took up to whatever films they wanted to see so I saw a lot of art films that would not be considered suitable for a child. She goes on to explain that her largest influences, especially as a child around the age of ten, were Alfred Hitchcock, Bergman, and Satyajit Ray. After she had moved to London in her teen years she began attending the National Film Theatre where she was exposed to other international filmmakers like Fritz Lang, Howard Hawks, Claude Chabrol, and Polanski. She was also exposed to noir films, namely Double Indemnity. As she got older and became an adult, her taste for film changed as well. She stated she was inspired by the films Blue Velvet, Drugstore Cowboy, and The Piano, directed by Jane Campion. While she said that she had plenty of exposure to Hollywood films, as most people do, she was enticed by these types of films because they were, in her words,  the “forerunners of independent film.”  A scene that is reminiscent of Alfred Hitchcock in American Psycho takes place in the staircase as Patrick Bateman is chasing the prostitute he named Christie with a chainsaw. The staircase symbolizes two of Hitchcock's films, both Vertigo and Psycho. It has aesthetic qualities that pertain to Hitchcock's style that definitely come through as an influence for Harron.

Career

Early writing work 
In New York, Harron helped start and write for Punk magazine as a music journalist; she was the first journalist to interview the Sex Pistols for an American publication. She grew up in the early punk scene of America. She found the culture easy for her to fit into and was constantly evolving and spreading into new demographics. During the 1980s, she was a drama critic for The Observer in London for a time, as well as working as a music critic for The Guardian and the New Statesman. In the late 1980s, Harron participated and began her film career writing and directing BBC Documentaries.

During the 1990s, Harron moved back to New York where she worked as a producer for PBS's Edge, a program dedicated to exploring American pop culture. It was at this time that Harron became interested in the life of Valerie Solanas, the woman who attempted to kill Andy Warhol. Harron suggested making a documentary about Solanas to her producers, who in turn encouraged her to develop the project into what would be her first feature film. Harron says she owes her success with her first film to Andy who helped to sell the controversial focus on the attempted murderess, Solanas.

I Shot Andy Warhol

Harron's feature film directorial debut, I Shot Andy Warhol, released in 1996, is the partially imagined story of Valerie Solanas' failed assassination attempt on Andy Warhol. She explains her interest in Solanas' life:

It won the sole acting award at that year's Sundance Film Festival for Lili Taylor's performance as Solanas.

American Psycho
Harron's second film, American Psycho, released in 2000, is based on the book of the same title by Bret Easton Ellis, which is notorious for its graphic descriptions of torture and murder. The protagonist, Patrick Bateman (Christian Bale), is an investment banker who goes on a killing spree. The New York Times Stephen Holden wrote of the film:

The film was mired in controversy before production began, due in large part to the legacy of the book's release. Harron has a liking for darker and more controversial topics, such as Valerie Solanas, but it was the satirical nature of the book that "inspired her film about perfunctory violence and obsessive consumption." As Harron began production, the crew had to contend with threats of protest, as the issue of violence in the media became crystallized by the Columbine shootings. Campaigns against the film continued throughout production, the Feminist Majority Foundation condemning the film as misogynist, and the Canadians Concerned About Violence in Entertainment (C-CAVE) convincing restaurant owners to deny Harron permission to film in their establishments. When returning to work with co-writer Guinevere Turner, Harron felt they were best suited for the job of American Psycho as they needed no hesitation on feminist values, especially after Turner's successful lesbian film Go Fish.

Although some criticized American Psycho for its violence against women, Harron and Turner made conscious decisions that project the female influence on this adaption. Harron's adaptation of this film changes the focus from purely Bateman's perspective to showcase the faces of the women as "the perspective in those murder scenes wasn't through Patrick Bateman but the women."

In the years following its release, the film has achieved cult status; the controversy surrounding it, to some, gave way to an appreciation of the film's satirical qualities, while many others remain critical of its violence and depiction of 1980s decadence. Harron would later describe in an interview with BBC, that American Psycho is a "period thing" that glimpsed at 1980s corporate capitalism, but from a distance.

The Notorious Bettie Page
The Notorious Bettie Page, released in 2005, starred Gretchen Mol as Bettie Page, the 1950s pinup model who became a sexual icon. The film shows Page as the daughter of religious and conservative parents, as well as the fetish symbol who became a target of a Senate investigation of pornography. For this film, Harron did historical character research, and interviewed several of Page's friends as well as Page's first husband. Page was legally bound to another project and so unable to be interviewed. Harron saw Page as an unwitting feminist figure who represented a movement for women's sexual liberation, with some similarities to and differences from Solanas. About the film, Harron said in 2006:

Harron later stated that the film suffered from false expectations, in that many male critics and male viewers expected and wanted the film to be "sexy", but that the film instead portrayed "what it’s like to be Bettie", and Page herself did not get a "sexual charge" out of her modelling.

The Moth Diaries

The Moth Diaries (2011), Harron's fourth feature film, is another adaption of an American novel, being based on Rachel Klein's 2002 novel of the same name. The film follows a group of girls living together at Brangwyn, a boarding school. A new student arrives, Ernessa (Lily Cole) and the girls begin to suspect that she is a vampire. Harron has described the film as a "gothic coming-of-age story" that explores the nuanced friendships of teenage girls as they are repeatedly confronted with the prospect of adulthood. This Gothic horror feature entangles teenage experiences of sexuality, close female friendships, and drama with supernatural elements.

The film was shot in and around Montreal, Quebec, Canada. It is a Canada-Ireland co-production as Harron worked with Irish production company Samson Films' David Collins.

Charlie Says
Harron directed the 2018 independent film Charlie Says, with a screenplay by Turner, which tells the real-life story of how three of Charles Manson's female followers (Susan Atkins, Patricia Krenwinkel, and Leslie Van Houten) came to terms with the magnitude of their crimes while incarcerated in the 1970s. Matt Smith played Manson in flashbacks. The film had initially been intended for another director, but when that director was no longer available Harron took over. Harron stated that she was fascinated by the psychological aspects of how the women ended up committing murder as a result of both manipulation by Manson and feelings of solidarity with one another.

Dalíland 
Dalíland is a 2022 film directed by Harron, from a screenplay from her husband John Walsh. The film, set in the 1970s, follows the marriage between painter Salvador Dalí and his wife Gala Dalí, played by Ben Kingsley and  Barbara Sukowa respectively. The film was shot in Liverpool and released at the 2022 Toronto International Film Festival.

Other work 
In addition to her films, Harron was also the executive producer of The Weather Underground, a documentary looking at the Weathermen (political activists and extremists of the 1970s). She has also worked in television, directing episodes of Oz, Six Feet Under, Homicide: Life on the Street, The L Word and Big Love. Working on the episode of Six Feet Under "The Rainbow of Her Reasons", Harron was brought back together with I Shot Andy Warhol actress, Lili Taylor.

Views
Harron has been at times labelled a feminist filmmaker, in part due to her film on lesbian feminist Valerie Solanas, I Shot Andy Warhol, as well as a lesbian storyline within her 2011 teenage Gothic horror film The Moth Diaries (2011). She has consistently denied this label, although she considers herself a feminist. In a 2006 interview, and then again during an interview in 2012, she stated:

She is a member of Film Fatales, a women's independent filmmaker collective.

Asked about her Canadian identity in a 2014 interview, Harron stated that she mostly felt "just not American". She stated that, to her, being Canadian meant "You don't think you're at the center of things." She also felt that, unlike American directors, she was not "a moralistic filmmaker. I'm not trying to tell people what to do, and I'm not trying to lead... I'm interested in ambiguity."

Although her films deal with controversial materials, like American Psycho, she does not put emphasis on gore and violence. She consistently stands for her films' meaningfulness in the face of adversity and urges those who protest her creations to be more open-minded, and the main example of this is her going on national Canadian Television and speaking against the creation of American Psycho.

Personal life 
Harron lives in New York with her husband, filmmaker John C. Walsh, and their two daughters.

Awards and nominations

Filmography

Film

Executive producer
 The Weather Underground (2002) (Documentary)
 The Notorious Bettie Page (2005)

Researcher
BBC documentary on Andy Warhol

Television

See also
 List of female film and television directors
 List of LGBT-related films directed by women

References

Bibliography
 Bussmann, Kate. "Cutting Edge."The Guardian.  March 5, 2009. p. 16. Print.

 Harron, Mary. "The Risky Territory of 'American Psycho.'" The New York Times 9 April 2000 late ed.: section 2. Print.
 Harron, Mary; "The Notorious Bettie Page" MovieNet. 
 Hernandez, Eugene (January 18, 2000) "PARK CITY 2000 BUZZ: "American Psycho" NC-17; Next Wave Nabs Sundance Doc". indieWire. Retrieved November 29, 2011.
 Hurd, Mary. Women Directors and Their Films. Westport: Praeger Publishers, 2007. Print.
 King, Randall. "The Notorious Mary Harron." Winnipeg Free Press.  March 1, 2012. Print.
 Marcus, Lydia. "The Pent Up and the Pinup." Lesbian News. April 2006: p. 43. Print.
 Murray, Rebecca. "Interview with Mary Harron, the Writer/Director of The Notorious Bettie Page: Harron Continues to Tackle Edgy Subject Matter in Her Latest Film" . About.com. Retrieved November 29, 2011.

External links

 
 Entry at thecanadianencyclopedia.ca
Marry Harron interview at NPR

Living people
Canadian documentary film producers
Canadian documentary film directors
Canadian feminist writers
Film producers from Ontario
20th-century Canadian screenwriters
Canadian television directors
Canadian women film directors
Canadian women film producers
Canadian women screenwriters
American women screenwriters
Canadian women television directors
Feminist artists
Melody Maker writers
People from Bracebridge, Ontario
Writers from Ontario
Canadian emigrants to the United States
Canadian expatriate film directors in the United States
Canadian expatriate writers in the United States
Canadian expatriates in the United Kingdom
Alumni of St Anne's College, Oxford
1953 births
Postmodernist filmmakers
Canadian women documentary filmmakers
20th-century Canadian women writers
21st-century Canadian screenwriters
21st-century Canadian women writers
Film directors from Ontario